is a Japanese luchador enmascarado (masked professional wrestler) currently working for the Japanese promotion Dragon Gate where he is a former Open the Triangle Gate Champion.

Professional wrestling career

Independent circuit (2019–present)
Machine J is known for seldomly competing for various promotions from the Japanese independent scene. At W-1 Wonder Carnival, an event promoted by Wrestle-1 on December 31, 2019, he teamed up with Strong Machine F and Strong Machine G to defeat Alejandro, Ganseki Tanaka and Masayuki Kono. At NOAH Global Dream, an event promoted by Pro Wrestling Noah on November 11, 2022, he teamed up with Jason Lee and U-T in a losing effort against Atsushi Kotoge, Dante Leon and Punch Tominaga.

Dragon Gate (2019–present)
Machine J made his professional wrestling debut in Dragon Gate on the third night of the Dragon Gate The Gate Of Passion 2019 from April 10, where he aligned himself with Strong Machine F and Strong Machine G into the "Strong Machine Gundan" stable and defeated Natural Vibes (Genki Horiguchi, Kzy and Susumu Yokosuka) in a six-man tag team match. During his time in the promotion, he became part of two more stables. The "Team Dragon Gate", and "Natural Vibes". His first title win was resumed to the Open the Triangle Gate Championship, title which he has first won at Kobe Pro-Wrestling Festival 2019 on July 21 alongside Strong Machine F and Strong Machine J by defeating  R.E.D (Kazma Sakamoto, Takashi Yoshida and Yasushi Kanda.

He is known for competing in various of the promotion's signature events, such as the King of Gate tournament, making his first appearance at the 2020 edition of the event where he fell short to Eita in the first rounds. At the 2022 edition, he defeated La Estrella in the first rounds, but fell short to Shun Skywalker in the second ones. He took part in a resurrection battle royal for a second chance in the tournament won by Kota Minoura ands also involving BxB Hulk, Kai, Kaito Ishida, Keisuke Okuda, Naruki Doi, Takashi Yoshida, Yamato, Dragon Kid and many others opponents from the ones who have been previously defeated in the past rounds.

He also competed in the Gate of Destiny series of pay-per-views, which is considered to be the promotion's top yearly event. He made his first appearance at the 2019 edition where he teamed up with Strong Machine F and Strong Machine G to successfully defend the Open the Triangle Gate Championship against MaxiMuM (Dragon Kid, Jason Lee and Naruki Doi). At the 2020 edition, he teamed up with Ben-K and Dragon Dia as "Team Dragon Gate" to defeat R.E.D (BxB Hulk, Dia Inferno and H.Y.O). At the 2021 edition he competed in a battle royal won by Jason Lee and also involving Ho Ho Lun, Yosuke Santa Maria, Mondai Ryu, Super Shisa, Punch Tominaga, Konomama Ichikawa and Shachihoko Boy. At the 2022 edition, he teamed up with "Natural Vibes" stablemate Big Boss Shimizu to unsuccessfully challenge D'courage (Dragon Dia and Madoka Kikuta) for the Open the Twin Gate Championship.

Personal life
Machine J is the son of the former professional wrestler Junji Hirata. He created his gimmick and ring name by paying tribute to his father's "Super Strong Machine" persona.

Championships and accomplishments
Dragon Gate
Open the Triangle Gate Championship (2 times) – with Ben-K and Dragon Dia (1); Strong Machine F and Strong Machine G (1)
Ashiyanikki Cup Six Man Tag Team Tournament (2020) – with Ben-K and Dragon Dia
Tokyo Sports Puroresu Awards
Rookie Of The Year (2019)

References

Living people
Masked wrestlers
Unidentified wrestlers
Japanese male professional wrestlers
People from Okayama Prefecture
Sportspeople from Okayama Prefecture
21st-century professional wrestlers
Year of birth missing (living people)